Collin Drafts (born April 11, 1985) is a former American football quarterback who played in the Arena Football League (AFL). He played college football at Charleston Southern University. He was signed as an undrafted free agent by the Tri-Cities Fever in 2007.

College career
Drafts attended Charleston Southern University, where he was a scholarship quarterback. As a four-year starter for the Buccaneers, Drafts accounted for over 90 touchdowns and 10,000 total yards in his career.

Professional career

Manchester Wolves
After going undrafted in 2007, Drafts attended a two-day workout with the Manchester Wolves of af2.

Tri-Cities Fever
In his first ever af2 start, Drafts threw 4 touchdown passes, as the Tri-Cities Fever lost 52-42 to the Boise Burn.

Green Bay Blizzard
Drafts played with the Green Bay Blizzard in 2008.

Amarillo Dusters
Drafts was the starting quarterback for the Amarillo Dusters during the 2009 season.

Dallas Vigilantes
In 2010, Drafts moved to the Arena Football League with the Dallas Vigilantes.

Orlando Predators
Drafts was about to give up professional football when Pat O'Hara called Drafts at his home, and convinced him to play for the Orlando Predators.

Jacksonville Sharks
Drafts played with the Jacksonville Sharks in 2012.

Orlando Predators
Drafts re-joined the Predators in 2012. He started the 2013 season with the Lakeland Raiders of the Ultimate Indoor Football League, but signed with the Predators to be their backup quarterback in June.

Hall of Fame Inductee

Battery Creek High School

Charleston Southern University

Big South Conference

Football coaching career

Currently one of the top high school QB coaches in the nation.

2011-2012 - Offensive Coordinator at Olympia High School in Orlando, Florida (Back to back District Champions)

2013-2015 - Offensive Coordinator/Quarterbacks Coach at West Orange High School in Winter Garden, Florida. (32-5 record in 3 years)
 
2016 - Head Coach East River High School in Orlando, Florida 2016. (6-5 made playoffs)

2017-2018 - Head Coach of A.C. Flora High School in Forest Acres, South Carolina (0-10 first year to 9-3 second year, made playoffs, and 4A Lower State Coach of the Year)
 
2019-Present - Head Coach at Allen D. Nease High School in Ponte Vedra, Florida. (1-9 first year), (1-7 second year), {(9-4 third year), 7th seed and advanced to 3rd round and 7A Playoff Region Final game. 7A District 6 Coach of the year.} (2-8 fourth year).

References

1985 births
Living people
American football quarterbacks
Charleston Southern Buccaneers football players
Tri-Cities Fever players
Green Bay Blizzard players
Amarillo Dusters players
Dallas Vigilantes players
Orlando Predators players
Jacksonville Sharks players
Lakeland Raiders players
Sportspeople from Beaufort, South Carolina
Players of American football from South Carolina